Jul, jul, strålande jul is a Christmas album by Anna-Lena Löfgren & Artur Erikson, released in November 1969 to LP. It has also been released to cassette tape. It was rereleased to CD in 1990. Artur Erikson contributes, with rights from the Mission Covenant Church of Sweden's record label on the songs: Jul, jul strålande jul, O,sälla dag, Det är en ros utsprungen and Räck mej din hand (vi har samma väg att gå).

Track listing

Side A 
Jul, jul, strålande jul / G. Nordqvist, E. Evers
Ave Maria / C. Gounod, efter J.S. Bach
Julsång (O, helga natt, Cantique de Noël) (Minuit, Chrétiens) / A. Adam, A. Kock
Betlehems stjärna (Gläns över sjö och strand) / A. Tegnér, V. Rydberg
Jag drömmer om en jul hemma (White Christmas) / I. Berlin, Karl-Lennart
Räck mej din hand (Vi har samma väg att gå) / trad., G. Strandsjö

Side B 
Julotta (Adeste Fideles) / trad., B. Haslum
Det är en ros utsprungen (Es ist ein Ros entsprungen) / trad., T. Knös
Stilla natt (Stille Nacht, heilige nacht) / F. Gruber, O. Mannström
Luciasången (Santa Lucia) / T. Cottrau, A. Rosén
O, sälla dag / trad., A. Erikson

References

Anna-Lena Löfgren albums
Artur Erikson albums
1969 Christmas albums
Christmas albums by Swedish artists
Schlager Christmas albums